Warwick Records is a British record label active in the 1970s and early 1980s, established by Ian Miles, which specialised in producing song compilations that were sometimes given away as 'promos' with other products, such as magazines. Warwick was also a TV-advertised budget record label, and was distributed by Multiple Sound Distributors in the UK.

History
In the late 1970s, Warwick became closely associated with CBS Records, releasing compilations from their catalogue such as Tony Bennett's 20 Greatest Hits by Tony Bennett, with Pye Records for three Acker Bilk albums, and The Hit album series. Promoted on TV at budget prices, many issues appeared in the UK album charts.

Artists

 Bert Weedon - the influential English guitarist and composer released the TV-advertised compilations 22 Golden Guitar Greats and Let The Good Times Roll on Warwick, licensed by Polydor Ltd (UK) Ltd.
 Acker Bilk - the clarinettist composer released the TV-advertised compilations Sheer Magic, Evergreen and Mellow Music on Warwick, licensed by Pye Records Ltd.
 Harry Secombe - the Welsh entertainer released the TV-advertised compilations Bless This House and Golden Memories: A Treasury Of 20 Unforgettable Songs (with Moira Anderson) on Warwick
 Adrian Brett - the golden flute player released the TV-advertised compilations Echoes Of Gold and Stepping Stones on Warwick
 Don Gibson - the American songwriter and country musician released the TV-advertised compilations Country Number One and Country My Way on Warwick
 Des O'Connor - building on his successful career as a singer, Warwick released the TV-advertised compilations Just For You: 20 Special Songs and Remember Romance - 20 Great Love Songs
 Brotherhood Of Man - the British pop group released two albums with the label: Sing 20 Number One Hits (1980) and 20 Disco Greats / 20 Love Songs (1981)

Albums

British record labels